Mujanović is a Bosnian surname. Notable people with the surname include:

 Alen Mujanovič (born 1976), Slovenian footballer
 Goran Mujanović (born 1983), Croatian footballer
 Razija Mujanović (born 1967), Bosnian basketball player

Bosnian surnames
Patronymic surnames